The following is a overview of all annual statistical leaders in a given season of the Basketball Africa League (BAL).

Key

Scoring leaders

Rebounding leader

Assists leaders

Steals leaders

Blocks leaders

Field goal percentage

Three-point field goals made

Three-point field goal percentage

References

Basketball Africa League
Basketball Africa League